The Singapore Premier League, commonly abbreviated as SPL, officially known as the AIA Singapore Premier League for sponsorship reasons, is a men's professional football league sanctioned by the Football Association of Singapore (FAS), which represents the sport's highest level in the Singapore football league system. 

The competition was founded as the S. League on 14 April 1996 after the FAS announced its intention to promote and expand the growing local football community by having a top level domestic league. As of 2022, the league comprises eight clubs, consisting of three rounds in which each team plays every other team once. Seasons run from late March to October, with teams playing 21 matches each, totalling 147 matches in the season.

Successful SPL clubs gain qualification into Asian continental club competitions, including the AFC Champions League and the AFC Cup. SPL currently does not practice promotion and relegation. Since the league's inception in 1996, 7 clubs have been crowned champions. Warriors FC have been the most successful club with 9 titles, followed by Tampines Rovers (5), Albirex Niigata Singapore FC (5), Lion City Sailors (3), Geylang International (2), DPMM FC (2) and Étoile FC (1). The current champions are Albirex Niigata, the Japanese satellite team, having won their fifth S-League title in the 2022 season.

History

Origins
Singapore had been represented in the Malaysia Cup through the Singapore Lions since 1921. The Lions were one of the most successful teams in the competition, having won it 24 times from 1921 to 1994. Following a dispute over gate receipts between the FAS and FAM after winning the league and cup double in 1994, the Lions withdrew from the Malaysian competitions.

Subsequently, the Football Association of Singapore decided to build a professional league system. However, as it was estimated to take about a year to put in place the structure of a professional league, the Singapore Lions were given match practice in what was then the top level of domestic football, the semi-professional FAS Premier League. This team won the last FAS Premier League title, finishing the season unbeaten.

Inaugural season
The S.League was founded in 1996. The FAS invited applications for clubs to compete in the newly formed league. Eight successful applications were made. Two clubs from the Premier League – powerhouse Geylang International (renamed Geylang United; 6 consecutive Premier League titles) and Balestier United (renamed Balestier Central – joined six from the amateur National Football League – Police, Singapore Armed Forces, Tampines Rovers, Tiong Bahru United, Wellington (renamed Woodlands Wellington) and Sembawang Rangers (merger of Gibraltar Crescent and Sembawang SC) – for the inaugural edition of the S.League. The season was split into the two series. Tiger Beer Series winners Geylang United defeated Pioneer Series winners Singapore Armed Forces 2–1 in the end of season championship playoff to be crowned the 1st S.League champions. The 30,000 crowd at the playoff remains the record attendance in the S.League.

Expansion of the league
Police FC renamed themselves as Home United for the 1997 season to reflect their representation of not only the Singapore Police Force, but also other HomeTeam Departments of the Singapore Ministry of Home Affairs such as the SCDF and the ICA. NFL side Jurong Town FC, who renamed themselves Jurong FC, joined the competition taking the number of participating clubs to 9. The league switched from its previous format to a round-robin competition. Singapore Armed Forces won their first title.

Gombak United and Marine Castle United joined the S.League in 1998, further taking the number of clubs to 11. Tiong Bahru United renamed themselves to Tanjong Pagar United at the start of the season. Singapore Armed Forces won their second consecutive title.

Clementi Khalsa joined the S.League in 1999 as a representative of the Sikh community in Singapore. The league took on 12 teams for the next five years. Home United won their first title.

Invited clubs
During the 2000s, the FAS decided to invite foreign clubs to the league to increase league competitiveness. Sinchi FC, a side composed of Chinese players became the first foreign club to participate in 2003. Shi Jiayi and Qiu Li went on to become naturalised Singapore players.

Sporting Afrique, a club made up of African players, and Super Reds, a side comprising South Korean players, became the third and fourth foreign clubs to join the competition in 2006 and 2007 respectively. Sporting Afrique were refused entry into the 2007 S.League due to off-field controversies and poor performance. In 2010, Super Reds were denied a place after three seasons following attempts to convert into a team of local players.

Chinese Super League clubs Liaoning FC (2007), Dalian Shide FC (2008) and Beijing Guoan FC (2010) entered their feeder clubs in the S.League. All three clubs each lasted one season before being pulled out of the league due to poor performances and disciplinary issues. Bruneian club DPMM FC joined the S.League in 2009 before being pulled from the league as a result of a FIFA ban. They re-entered the league from 2012. They were the first club to base themselves outside of Singapore. In 2010, French club Étoile FC became the first foreign side to win the S.League. Etoile pulled out of the S.League prior to the 2012 season to focus on grassroots football and youth development.

In 2012, Malaysia national youth sides Harimau Muda A and Harimau Muda B joined the S.League following an agreement between the Football Association of Singapore and the Football Association of Malaysia (FAM) to send their representative sides into their respective domestic competitions. Singaporean side LionsXII returned to the Malaysian competitions in 2012. Echoing the former Singapore FA, the LionsXII quickly became a successful force in the Malaysian league system during its short stint, winning the league title in 2013 as well as the FA Cup in 2015.

However, on 25 November 2015, the FAM decided not to extend their Memorandum of Understanding (MoU) with the FAS. This automatically disqualified LionsXII from further entering any football tournament in Malaysia. Similarly, Malaysia's squad Harimau Muda did not participate in the Singapore League from then onwards.

J.League club Albirex Niigata entered their feeder club Albirex Niigata Singapore in the 2004 S.League. The club became the most established foreign side in the S.League, drawing on the support the Japanese expatriate community and some local fans. As of 2023, they are the foreign side with the longest involvement in Singaporean football.

20th season
The league took on a number of changes for the 2015 season to increase its competitiveness. The number of clubs was reduced from 12 to 10, with the withdrawal of Tanjong Pagar United due to financial problems, and the merger of Woodlands Wellington and Hougang United. The league returned to a three-round format used from 2001 to 2011. The foreign player quota remained at five per club, but incentives were given to those who signed an under-21 player. The passing time for the mandatory 2.4 km fitness test was lowered from 10 mins to 9 mins 45 s. A new rule on age restrictions – a maximum of five players aged 30 and above and a minimum of three under-25 players for clubs with a 22-man squad, a maximum of four players aged 30 and above and a minimum of two under-25 players for clubs with a 20-man squad – was later reversed.

Rebranding
The league was rebranded as the Singapore Premier League on 21 March 2018. Further revamps were also made to see a greater emphasis on local youth players in a bid to strengthen the national side; this, in effect, has resulted in a number of senior as well as local and foreign stars being purchased by overseas clubs.

Competition format

Structure
Teams receive three points for a win and one point for a draw. No points are awarded for a loss. Teams are ranked by total points, then goal difference, and then goals scored. 

At the end of each season, the club with the most points is crowned league champion. If the points, goal difference, goals scored, and head-to-head results between teams are equal, head-to-head records between the teams are used, followed by a better fair play record. 

There is no relegation or promotion system in the league. Clubs enter the Singapore Premier League by invitation of the Football Association of Singapore.

Clubs
A total of 25 clubs have played in the league from its inception in 1996 up to and including the 2022 season. The following 9 clubs are competing in the league during the 2023 season. There is two non-Singaporean club that currently competes in the Singapore Premier League – Albirex Niigata (S) is a satellite team of the Japanese club of the same name and DPMM of the Brunei.

Balestier Khalsa, Geylang International, Lion City Sailors FC and Tampines Rovers are clubs that have played in all 26 seasons of the Singapore Premier League as of 2022.

Former clubs 
 Gombak United (1998–2002, 2006–2012)
 Woodlands Wellington (1996–2014)
 Sembawang Rangers (1996–2003)
 Jurong FC (1997–2003)
 Warriors FC (1996–2019)

Years in brackets indicates seasons active in the league.

Invited clubs
  Sinchi FC (2003–2005)
  Super Reds (2007–2009)
  Sporting Afrique (2006)
  Liaoning Guangyuan (2007)
  Dalian Shide Siwu (2008)
  Beijing Guoan Talent (2010)
  Étoile (2010–2011) 
  Harimau Muda A (2012)
  Harimau Muda B (2013–2015)

Years in brackets indicates seasons active in the league.

International competitions

Qualification for Asian competitions
The league's winners qualify for the AFC Champions League, while Singapore Cup winners qualify for the AFC Cup playoff spot. In the event of the same club winning both the S.League and Singapore Cup, the runners-up of the league takes up the AFC Cup qualification spot. Foreign clubs are ineligible to represent the Football Association of Singapore in AFC continental competitions. The qualification spot is given to the next best-placed local club in the league if a foreign club wins any of the two competitions.

Past champions
The league has seen five clubs win the title since its inception. Warriors FC (formerly Singapore Armed Forces FC) hold the most titles at nine. In 2010, Étoile FC became the first foreign side to win the competition.

* The inaugural season of the S.League was split into two series. The winners of each series completed in a championship playoff in which Geylang United defeated Singapore Armed Forces to claim the first S.League title.

Performance by clubs

Awards

Top scorers

* Mirko Grabovac was a naturalised Singapore player from 2002 until he renounced his Singapore citizenship in 2008.

Source:

Player of the Year Award

Young Player of the Year

* Fahrudin Mustafić held Serbian citizenship before being naturalised to play for Singapore in 2007.

Coach of the Year

People's Choice Award

Fair Play Award

Special awards

100 S.League goals

200 S.League goals

300 goals

All-time league table
The all-time Singapore Premier League table is a cumulative record of all match results, points and goals of every team that has played in the league since its inception in 1996. The table that follows is accurate as of the end of the 2014 season. Teams in bold are part of the 2019 season.

 

 a: Does not include the title playoff match at the end of 1996 Season. Geylang United defeated Singapore Armed Forces 2–1 to clinch the S.League title.
 b: Sinchi FC had 3 points deducted for gross misconduct in 2005.
 c: Woodlands Wellington had 6 points deducted for match walkout in 2007.
 d: 2009 results involving DPMM FC were annulled due to a FIFA ban.
 e: Young Lions and Beijing Guoan Talent had 5 points deducted each for gross misconduct in 2010.
 f: Étoile FC and Hougang United had 5 points deducted each for pre-match brawl in 2011.

See also

 Singapore Cup
 Singapore League Cup
 Singapore Community Shield
 Singapore National Football League
 Sports in Singapore
 Football in Singapore
 List of football clubs in Singapore
 Prime League
 Women's Premier League (Singapore)

Notes

References

External links

 Official website
 League at FIFA

 
Football competitions in Singapore
Singapore
1996 establishments in Singapore
Sports leagues established in 1996
Professional sports leagues in Singapore